is a town in Kamikawa Subprefecture, Hokkaido, Japan.
As of September 2016, the town has an estimated population of 1,571.

History
On April 1, 2010, Horokanai was transferred from Sorachi Subprefecture to Kamikawa Subprefecture.

Culture

Mascot

She is a healthy and hard working buckwheat seed. She carries a soba choko and chopsticks to eat her homemade soba noodles. She wears traditional Japanese chef clothing and a buckwheat flower on her head. She carries is a huge stick (that doubles as a staff weapon) on her back. She is unveiled on 18 June 2013.

Climate
Horokanai has a humid continental climate (Köppen: Dfb).

References

External links

Official Website 

Towns in Hokkaido